Ronnbergia hathewayi is a plant species in the genus Ronnbergia. This species is native to Costa Rica.

References

hathewayi
Flora of Costa Rica